Charles P. "Sparrow" McCaffrey  (1868 – April 29, 1894) was an American baseball player.

Career
Charles McCaffrey, born in Philadelphia, got his nickname "Sparrow" honestly: listed at 120 pounds, he was one of the lightest Major League Baseball players ever. (The midget Eddie Gaedel was just 65 pounds; Hall of Fame pitcher Candy Cummings also weighed in at 120.)

McCaffrey, a catcher, began his baseball career with the local Norristown, Pennsylvania team of the Middle States League in 1889; just 21 years old, the Columbus Solons of the American Association took a flyer on him that same year. On August 13, 1889, in St. Louis, he made his debut for the Solons, replacing catcher Jack O'Connor late in the contest, notching a single and scoring a run. Two days later, again against the Browns, McCaffrey was sent in as a pinch hitter, drawing a walk; this makes him one of only 30 players in MLB history owning a perfect 1.000 on-base average with at least two plate appearances.

"Sparrow" returned to the minors in 1890, playing the next three seasons in Lebanon, Pennsylvania, Troy, New York and with his hometown Philadelphia Athletics of the Eastern League (unrelated to either the early team with that name or the later American League franchise). He died in Philadelphia in 1894, at the age of 26.

Sources

Major League Baseball catchers
19th-century baseball players
Columbus Solons players
1868 births
1894 deaths
Lebanon Cedars players
Troy Trojans (minor league) players
Philadelphia Athletics (minor league) players
Baseball players from Pennsylvania